"Super Love Song" is the forty-fourth single by B'z, released on October 3, 2007. The song peaked at number one on the Oricon Charts, and is B'z 40th consecutive number one single, with 180,650 sales.  The following week it dropped to #3. The B-side "Friction" was featured on the racing games Burnout Dominator and Burnout Paradise.

Track listing
Super Love Song - 3:59
 - 4:01
Friction - 3:06

Personnel
 Tak Matsumoto - Electric guitar
 Koshi Inaba - Lead vocals
 Jeremy Colson - Drums (on tracks 1 and 2)
 Shane Gaalaas - Drums (on track 3)
 Robert DeLeo - Bass (on tracks 1 and 2)
 Patrick Warrend - Mellotron (on track 2)
 Akihito Tokunaga - Bass (on track 3)
 Akira Onozuka - Organ (on track 1), Piano (on track 2).
 Tama Strings - Strings

Certifications

References
 Oricon ranking as of October 2007
 Oricon ranking for week 41 of 2007

External links
 B'z official website
 Super Love Song on B'z no bise(Translation in French)

2007 singles
B'z songs
Oricon Weekly number-one singles
Songs written by Tak Matsumoto
Songs written by Koshi Inaba
2007 songs